Air Bee S.p.A. was an airline based in Rome, Italy. The airline has suspended operations on 11 September 2008 but has announced plans to possibly restart operations by the end of the month without providing further details on its planned route network should operations resume. The entrepreneur Robert Clarke owns the airbee.com domain having purchased from the liquidator. The URL is currently for sale on afternic. 

On 15 December 2008, corporate meeting declared liquidation.

Destinations

Berlin
Bari
Birmingham
Brescia
Crotone
Milan
Naples
Olbia
Prague
Rome
Trapani
Venice

Fleet 
The Air Bee fleet consisted of the following aircraft:

See also
 List of defunct airlines of Italy

References

Italian companies established in 2008
Italian companies disestablished in 2008
Defunct airlines of Italy
Airlines established in 2008
Airlines disestablished in 2008
Companies based in Rome